Albion was a country ship launched at Calcutta in 1805. A fire in December 1807 destroyed Albion at Canton. She was carrying a valuable cargo of silks and dollars.

The dollars were salvaged. The reason Albion was carrying them was that the British merchants in Canton wanted to ship them back to Calcutta on a warship, but the Chinese authorities would not permit naval vessels to come up the Pearl River past the Bogue. They therefore engaged Albion to use her boats to get the silver from Canton to Whampoa Anchorage, and then herself carry the silver to Chuenpi, near the mouth of the river, just below the Bogue. At the time, commanders of naval vessels were permitted to carry bullion for merchants in return for a fee on the value of the freight that, unlike prize or head money, the commander did not have to share with his officers and crew. Eventually the dispute reached the Governor-in-Council in Calcutta, who imposed a cap of 1% on the fee.

Notes, citations, and references
Notes

Citations

References
 
 
 

1805 ships
British ships built in India
Age of Sail merchant ships of England
Maritime incidents in 1807